John Andrew Mistler (born October 28, 1958) is a former American football wide receiver in the National Football League (NFL) for the New York Giants and the Buffalo Bills in addition to  the Arizona Outlaws of the United States Football League.  He was drafted in the third round of the 1981 NFL Draft by the Giants out of Arizona State University.

Mistler worked as a color analyst on Arizona Cardinals radio broadcasts from 1994–2005. He was inducted into the Sahuaro High School Alumni (Cougar Foundation) Hall of Fame in 1999.

References

1958 births
Living people
Arizona Cardinals announcers
American football wide receivers
Arizona State Sun Devils football players
Arizona State University alumni
Buffalo Bills players
National Football League announcers
New York Giants players
Sportspeople from Columbia, Missouri
Players of American football from Missouri
Sahuaro High School alumni
Arizona Outlaws players